William Farrar (April 1583 – ) was a landowner and politician in colonial Virginia. He was a subscriber to the third charter of the Virginia Company who immigrated to the colony from England in 1618. After surviving the Jamestown massacre of 1622, he moved to Jordan's Journey. In the following year, Farrar became involved in North America's first breach of promise suit when he proposed to Cecily Jordan.

In 1626, Farrar was appointed to the Council of Virginia where he served as an advisor to the royal governor, a judge of the highest court in the colony, and a member of the Virginia General Assembly of Colonial Jamestown. He was also appointed magistrate of the upper James River community. In both these roles, he served as a voice of the early planters' interest as the colony transitioned from being managed by the Virginia Company and becoming a royal colony under Charles I of England.

Farrar was also on the Council when it arrested Governor John Harvey for misgovernance and forced his temporary return to England. By the time of his death around 1637, Farrar had sold off his remaining assets in England and established rights to a 2000 acre patent on Farrar's Island, located on a curl of the James River.

Background
William Farrar was born before April 28, 1583, the date of his christening, in Croxton, Lincolnshire, England. He was the 3rd son of John Farrar of Croxton and London, Esquire, a wealthy merchant and landowner with various holdings in West Yorkshire, Lincolnshire, and Hertfordshire, and Cecily Kelke, an heiress  and direct descendant of Edward III of England. The nineteenth century historian of Virginia, Alexander Brown, states that while in England, William Farrar received an education in law.

Relation to the Virginia Company and immigration to the New World 

When Farrar went to Virginia, it was still part of the Virginia Company of London, a joint-stock company, sanctioned by Royal Charter. Farrar was a subscriber to the Third Charter of the Virginia Company, where his name appears as "William Ferrers". His subscription consisted of three shares that were bought for a total of £37 10s (equivalent to about $ today). Farrar also had family interests in the Virginia Company as two of his second cousins, the brothers John Ferrar and Nicholas Ferrar, played key roles in the managing the company's interests.

Farrar left London on Neptune on March 16, 1617/18   along with Virginia's governor, Thomas West, Baron De La Warr.  De La Warr had been commissioned by the Virginia Company to return to the colony with fresh people and supplies to help it achieve political and economic stability, but he died en route. When Farrar arrived in August 1618, news of the governor's death threw Jamestown into turmoil, Deputy Governor Samuel Argall, who was already unpopular with many colonists, was accused of mismanagement and  the unauthorized misappropriation of  Neptune'''s passengers and cargo. After a prolonged series of accusations from both the Virginia Company and colonists against Argall's governing, he finally stepped down in April 1619.

In June 1619, the Virginia Company instructed that 40 indentured servants be put at the disposal of Farrar when they arrived in Virginia.  The payment for the cost of transporting these colonists would have resulted in a 2000 acre headright at 50 acres a head. However, Garland never arrived in Jamestown because it was damaged in a hurricane while en route. Instead of proceeding to Virginia, the Garlands captain, William Wye left the remaining passengers in  Bermuda and sailed the repaired ship directly back to England.

As his personal headright, Farrar did receive a land patent for 100 acres on the Appomattox River close to where it flows into the James River, near what is now known as Hopewell, Virginia. In the meantime,  the resultant legal suits between Wye and  the Virginia Company regarding the financial responsibility for the Garland fiasco were not resolved until the end of 1622,  when Farrar had already quit residence at his patent as a result of the Powhatan surprise attack of 1621/22.

 Move to Jordan's Journey and marriage

During the Powhatan surprise attack, ten settlers on Farrar's land on the Appomattox River were killed. However, Farrar survived and got to Samuel Jordan's settlement at Beggars Bush, part of the plantation known as Jordan's Journey. After the attack, William Farrar stayed at Jordan's Journey as it had become a relatively safe fortified rallying place for the survivors.

Samuel Jordan died before June 1623. Sometime afterward, Farrar proposed marriage to Jordan's pregnant widow, Cecily, which involved him in the  first breach of promise suit filed in North America. Reverend Greville Pooley claimed he had first proposed marriage three or four days after Samuel Jordan had died and Cecily had accepted. However, Cecily denied his proposal and accepted Farrar's, which resulted in Pooley filing the suit.  The case continued for almost two years. During the suit, Alexander Brown suggests that Farrar may have acted as Cecily's legal representative.   Eventually, Pooley signed an agreement in January 1624/5 that acquitted Cecily Jordan of her alleged former promises.

Even as the case was ongoing, William Farrar and Cecily Jordan continued to work together at Jordan's Journey. In November 1623, Farrar was bonded to execute Samuel Jordan's will regarding the management of his estate and Cecily Jordan was warranted to put down the security to guarantee Farrar's bondage. During this time, "Farrar assumed the role of plantation 'commander' or 'head of hundred'" for Jordan's Journey. A year later, the Jamestown muster of 1624/25 lists "fferrar William mr & Mrs. Jordan"[sic] as sharing the head of a Jordan's Journey household with three daughters and ten manservants. During this time, Jordan's Journey prospered.  By May 1625 Farrar and Jordan were finally married, as it was then that Farrar was released from his bond to Jordan's estate.They had three children together: Cecily (born 1625), William (birth year uncertain), and John (born around 1632).

 Roles in the royal colony 
On March 14, 1625/6, William Farrar was appointed councillor to the Council of Virginia by Charles I of England. Farrar held this position, which entitled him as an esquire of Virginia, until at least 1635 when Governor John Harvey was deported.

Farrar became a councillor during a period of uncertainty for the colonists. The 1619 Great Charter of the Virginia Company had established self-governance through the Virginia Assembly, but James I dissolved the charter in 1624, and put the colony under direct royal authority. Just before James I died in March 1625, Charles I announced his intention to be the sole factor of his royal colonies. To this end, he commissioned a new structure, consisting of a governor, Sir George Yeardley, and 13 councillors, including William Farrar, to govern the royal colony on behalf of the Crown's interest. Because the assembly was not included in the commission, the Council was the only legal body representing the interests of the Virginia planters. This state of affairs continued until the petitions of the colonists allowed the continuance of the House of Burgesses and the re-convention of the Virginia Assembly in 1628. The Council also functioned as the highest court in Virginia and as the advisory board to the governor regarding the creation of legislative acts. Just as importantly, the members of the Council could determine the fate of the governor. Farrar was on the Council when it elected John Pott as governor in 1628. He was also on the Council  when it temporarily deported Governor Harvey in 1635. Harvey's silencing of Farrar when he questioned the governor's proceedings with the council initiated the protest that eventually led to the governor's arrest and expulsion.

In August 1626, Farrar was also appointed by Yeardley as commissioner (i.e., magistrate) of the "Upper Partes"[sic]  which lies along the James River west of Piersey's Hundred having jurisdiction over Charles City and the City of Henrico. Farrar was the head commissioner of six commissioners appointed: he was the one given the right of final judgement when present and allowed the discretion to hold monthly courts at either Jordan's Journey or Shirley Hundred.  When his commission was renewed by Governor Sir John Harvey in 1632, it also mandated that the court could only be in session when Farrar was present.

After 1619, settlers could purchase the cost of transporting white indentured servants from England to the New World as a contract that could be redeemed as a headright, and these headright contracts could be used for speculation by being sold, bought, or bartered. William Farrar was one of the settlers involved in this activity. For example, he is listed in patents as selling headrights to the settler William Andrewes around 1628 and surrendering land to Nathan Martin for the transport of servants in 1636

 Sale of inheritance 
When William Farrar's father, John the elder, died sometime before May 1628, he willed his various landholdings in Hertfordshire to William. In addition, John Farrar also stipulated that William and his family receive a £20 annuity from his older brother from rents in Halifax Parish, Yorkshire and that William receive £50 upon his return to England. In 1631,  William Farrar returned to England to claim his inheritance.  He then sold the assets from his inheritance to his brothers, including his annuity for £240 and his landholdings for £200, for a total of £440 (equivalent to about $ today) and returned to Virginia.

Farrar's Island

At the time of his death sometime before June 11, 1637, Farrar was described as being "of Henrico", one of eight shires established in Virginia three years previously.  By the time of his death, he had established his headright to a 2000 acre land patent at a site that included Dutch Gap and the former settlement of Henrico. This headright was given for 40 indentured servants, who were named in the patent. After Farrar's death, the headright was repatented to his oldest son, his namesake who was twelve years old at the time, by John Harvey, who had returned from England and resumed his role as governor of the colony.

The patent was issued for land that included a peninsula formed by meander loop, or curl, of the James River subsequently known as Farrar's Island. It is described in the patent as abutting the glebe lands of Varina in the east, and extending to the James River in the south, the end of the island (i.e., peninsula) in the west, and "to the woods" in the north.  Farrar's Island remained with the Farrar family until it was sold in 1727.

Notes

References

Further reading

Stanard, William G., ed. (1900-1902) The "Farrar Family" Excursus in The Virginia Magazine of History and Biography, 
 

.
(Note'': The Vol. 7(4) entry in the excursus is incorrect on William Farrar's lineage. See  referenced above.)

1583 births
1637 deaths
History of Virginia
First Families of Virginia
Virginia colonial people
People from Lincolnshire
English emigrants